Don't Shoot the Composer is a 1966 British documentary on the French cinema composer Georges Delerue. It was made by Ken Russell who used Delerue's music in French Dressing and would use it in Women in Love.

References

External links

Don't Shoot the Composer at BFI

1966 films
Films directed by Ken Russell
British television documentaries
1960s English-language films
1960s British films